Plectranthias is a genus of ray-finned fish in the subfamily Anthiinae, part of the family Serranidae, the groupers and sea basses. They are found in the Atlantic, Indian and Pacific Ocean.

Species
There are currently 57 recognized species in this genus:
Plectranthias ahiahiata Shepherd, Phelps, Pinheiro, Pérez-Matus & Rocha 2018 
Plectranthias alcocki Bineesh, Gopalakrishnan & Jena, 2014 (Alcock's perchlet) 
 Plectranthias alleni J. E. Randall, 1980 (Allen's perchlet)
 Plectranthias altipinnatus Katayama & Masuda, 1980
 Plectranthias anthioides (Günther, 1872)
 Plectranthias bauchotae J. E. Randall, 1980
 Plectranthias bennetti G. R. Allen & F. M. Walsh, 2015 (Bennett's perchlet) 
 Plectranthias bilaticlavia Paulin & C. D. Roberts, 1987
 Plectranthias cirrhitoides J. E. Randall, 1980
Plectranthias cruentus  
 Plectranthias elaine Heemstra & J. E. Randall, 2009
 Plectranthias elongatus K. Y. Wu, J. E. Randall & J. P. Chen, 2011 
 Plectranthias exsul Heemstra & W. D. Anderson, 1983
 Plectranthias fijiensis U. Raj & Seeto, 1983
 Plectranthias flammeus J. T. Williams, Delrieu-Trottin & Planes, 2013 (Flame perchlet) 
 Plectranthias foresti Fourmanoir, 1977
 Plectranthias fourmanoiri J. E. Randall, 1980 (Double-spot perchlet)
 Plectranthias gardineri (Regan, 1908) 
 Plectranthias garrupellus C. R. Robins & Starck, 1961 (Apricot perchlet)
 Plectranthias helenae J. E. Randall, 1980 
Plectranthias hinano Shepherd, Phelps, Pinheiro, Rocha & Rocha 2020 (Hinano Perchlet)
 Plectranthias inermis J. E. Randall, 1980 (Checkered perchlet)
 Plectranthias intermedius (Kotthaus, 1973)
 Plectranthias japonicus (Steindachner, 1883) (Japanese perchlet)
 Plectranthias jothyi J. E. Randall, 1996
 Plectranthias kamii J. E. Randall, 1980
 Plectranthias kelloggi (D. S. Jordan & Evermann, 1903) 
 Plectranthias klausewitzi Zajonz, 2006
 Plectranthias knappi J. E. Randall, 1996 
 Plectranthias lasti J. E. Randall & Hoese, 1995 (Trawl perchlet)
 Plectranthias longimanus (M. C. W. Weber, 1913) (Long-fin perchlet)
 Plectranthias maculicauda (Regan, 1914) (Spot-tail perchlet)
 Plectranthias maugei J. E. Randall, 1980
 Plectranthias megalepis (Günther, 1880)
 Plectranthias megalophthalmus Fourmanoir & J. E. Randall, 1979 (Citron perchlet)
 Plectranthias morgansi (J. L. B. Smith, 1961) (Flag-fin perchlet)
 Plectranthias nanus J. E. Randall, 1980 (Bown-band perchlet)
 Plectranthias nazcae W. D. Anderson, 2008 (Red perchlet)
 Plectranthias pallidus J. E. Randall & Hoese, 1995 (Pale perchlet)
 Plectranthias parini W. D. Anderson & J. E. Randall, 1991 (Parin's perchlet)
 Plectranthias pelicieri J. E. Randall & Shimizu, 1994
Plectranthias polygonius Shepherd, Phelps, Pinheiro, Rocha & Rocha 2020 (Polygon Perchlet)
Plectranthias purpuralepis Tang, Lai & Ho, 2020 
Plectranthias randalli Fourmanoir & Rivaton, 1980
 Plectranthias retrofasciatus Fourmanoir & J. E. Randall, 1979
 Plectranthias robertsi J. E. Randall & Hoese, 1995 (Filamentous perchlet)
 Plectranthias rubrifasciatus Fourmanoir & J. E. Randall, 1979
 Plectranthias sagamiensis (Katayama, 1964)
 Plectranthias sheni J. P. Chen & K. T. Shao, 2002
 Plectranthias takasei A. C. Gill, Y. K. Tea & Senou, 2016 (Hinomaru perchlet) 
 Plectranthias taylori J. E. Randall, 1980
 Plectranthias vexillarius J. E. Randall, 1980
 Plectranthias wheeleri J. E. Randall, 1980 (Spotted perchlet)
 Plectranthias whiteheadi J. E. Randall, 1980
 Plectranthias winniensis (J. C. Tyler, 1966) (Red-blotch perchlet)
 Plectranthias xanthomaculatus K. Y. Wu, J. E. Randall & J. P. Chen, 2011 
 Plectranthias yamakawai Yoshino, 1972

References

 
Marine fish genera
Anthiinae
Taxa named by Pieter Bleeker